Monsterland is an American drama anthology horror streaming television series created by Mary Laws, based upon the short story collection North American Lake Monsters: Stories by Nathan Ballingrud. It consists of eight episodes and premiered on October 2, 2020, on Hulu.

Episodes

Production

Development
In May 2019, it was announced Hulu had given the series an eight-episode order, with Mary Laws creating the series and serving as an executive producer based upon the short story North American Lake Monsters: Stories by Nathan Ballingrud, with Babak Anvari and Lucan Toh serving as executive producers with Anvari set to direct an episode of the series, and Annapurna Television attached to produce. The series was released on October 2, 2020.

Casting
In November 2019, it was announced Kaitlyn Dever and Jonathan Tucker had joined the cast of the series, appearing in the first episode. In February 2020, Mike Colter joined the cast of the series. In July 2020, it was announced Kelly Marie Tran and Taylor Schilling had joined the cast of the series. In August 2020, it was announced Nicole Beharie, Adepero Oduye, Roberta Colindrez, Charlie Tahan and Hamish Linklater had joined the cast of the series.

Filming
The series was filmed in Kingston, New York, in November 2019.

Reception
For the series, review aggregator Rotten Tomatoes reported an approval rating of 82% based on 28 reviews, with an average rating of 6.71/10. The website's critics' consensus reads, "Though it struggles to find a strong through line, Monsterland cross-country scares are a perfect showcase for its talented cast and crew." Metacritic gave the series a weighted average score of 63 out of 100 based on five reviews, indicating "generally favorable reviews".

References

External links
 
 

2020 American television series debuts
2020 American television series endings
2020s American anthology television series
2020s American drama television series
2020s American horror television series
Horror anthology web series
Hulu original programming
Television shows based on American novels
Television shows filmed in New York (state)